Sangar District is a district (bakhsh) in Rasht County, Gilan Province, Iran. At the 2006 census, its population was 57,478, in 15,954 families.  The district has one city: Sangar. The district has three rural districts (dehestan): Eslamabad Rural District, Sangar Rural District, and Saravan Rural District.

References 

Rasht County
Districts of Gilan Province